Dimitrios Galanis (born December 10, 1971) is a Greek professional basketball coach.

Coaching career 
Galanis coaches from his 18 but he became head coach at top level coaching Iraklis B.C. (A1, Top Greek League), Pierikos B.C. (A2, Second Greek League), Kavala B.C. (A1, Top Greek League) and Lukoil Academic (champion of Bulgaria, Eurocup).

References

1971 births
Living people
Greek basketball coaches